Volinanserin (INN) (developmental code name MDL-100,907) is a highly selective 5-HT2A receptor antagonist that is frequently used in scientific research to investigate the function of the 5-HT2A receptor. It was also tested in clinical trials as a potential antipsychotic, antidepressant, and treatment for insomnia but was never marketed.

See also 
 Glemanserin
 Pruvanserin
 Roluperidone
 Lenperone
 Lidanserin
 Ketanserin
 Ritanserin
 Eplivanserin
 Pimavanserin

References 

5-HT2A antagonists
Fluoroarenes
Piperidines
Secondary alcohols
Phenol ethers
Abandoned drugs